Alizarine Yellow R is a yellow colored azo dye made by the diazo coupling reaction. It is usually commercially available as a sodium salt. In its pure form, it is a rust-colored solid. It is mainly used as a pH indicator.

References

External links
Alizarin Yellow R at Sigma Aldrich

Azo dyes
Salicylic acids
Nitrobenzenes
Organic sodium salts